The following article shows a List of caves in France:

Caves
 Bédeilhac cave
 Bétharram caves
 Bournillon cave, the highest cave opening in Europe. Part of the Vercors Cave System
 Bruniquel Cave, an archaeological site dated at 176,000 years with stalagmite rings constructed by Neanderthal men
 , near Carcassonne (city)
 Chauvet Cave, and its replica (for protection) Pont-d'Arc cave
 Cosquer Cave, only sub-marine access), (its replica is in construction).
 Font-de-Gaume cave, near Les Eyzies-de-Tayac-Sireuil
 ,
 Gargas caves
 , near Les Eyzies-de-Tayac-Sireuil
 Savonnières caves
 St-Médard-de-Presque cave
 Grotte des Demoiselles, near Nîmes
 , near Nice (city)
 Jean Bernard cave system, in competition as world's deepest cave
 Grotte des Fées cave
 La Mansonnière cave, one of the longest chalk caves
 , near Alès (city)
 La Verna cave, part of the 
 Lascaux Cave
 Les Combarelles cave
 Lombrives caves, this cave network is one of the most extensive in Europe and has seven distinct levels
 Niaux cave
 Pech Merle cave
 Rouffignac Cave
 Villars Cave

Pit Caves
 Armand pit cave
 Berger pit cave, the first cave explored to more than 1,000m depth 
 Les Corneilles pit cave
 Mirolda pit cave, in competition as the world's deepest cave
 Orgnac pit cave
 Padirac pit cave

See also 
 List of caves
 Speleology
 Vercors Cave System

 
France
Caves